Nunez is the anglicized form of the Spanish surname Núñez. The Portuguese (and Old Galician) variant is Nunes. Notable people with the name include:

Academia
 Antonio Núñez Jiménez, Cuban revolutionary and academic
 Jorge Núñez Prida, Mexican engineer and Scouting president
 Juan Núñez de la Peña, Spanish historian
 Lautaro Núñez Atencio, Chilean historian

Arts
 Françoise Nuñez,  French photographer

Drama
 Conchita Núñez (1943–2009), Spanish actress
 Joseph Nunez, United States actor
 Miguel A. Núñez, Jr., American actor
 Oscar Nunez, United States actor and comedian
 Oscar Núñez (Argentine actor)

Exploration
 Álvar Núñez Cabeza de Vaca, Spanish explorer
 Vasco Núñez de Balboa, Spanish explorer, governor, and conquistador

Literature

Authors
 Elizabeth Nunez, United States writer
 Hernán Núñez (1475–1553), Spain writer and collector of proverbs
 , Venezuelan philosopher
 Sigrid Nunez, United States writer
 Silvia Núñez del Arco, Peruvian author

Fictional
 Alex Nuñez, a character in Degrassi: The Next Generation

Music
 Alcide Nunez, United States jazz clarinetist
 Alejandro Núñez Allauca
 José Nunez, United States electronica and house music producer
 Carlos Núñez Muñoz, Spanish musician from Galicia
 Carlos Núñez Cortés, a member of Argentine comedy-musical group Les Luthiers
 , Venezuelan composer
 Jorge Núñez (singer), American Idol contestant
 Antonio Escobar Núñez, a Spanish composer, music producer and sound designer

Politics and military

 Aaron Nunez Cardozo, 1762–1834, Gibraltarian consul for Tunis and Algie
 Alberto Núñez Feijóo (born 1961), Spanish politician
 Casto Méndez Núñez (1824–1869), Spanish military naval officer
 Blasco Núñez Vela, Spanish viceroy of Peru
 Carmen Rosa Núñez Campos (born 1954), Peruvian entrepreneur and politician
 Corazon Nuñez-Malanyaon, Philippine politician
 Devin Nunes, member of the United States Congress and chair of the House Intelligence Committee
 Emilio Núñez (1855-1922), Cuban soldier, dentist, and politician
 Emilio Núñez Portuondo (1898-1978), Cuban politician
 Fabian Núñez (born 1966), US-American politician
 José Núñez de Cáceres (1772–1846), Dominican politician and writer
 Marco Antonio Núñez (born 1966), Chilean politician
 Osvaldo Nunez, Canadian politician
 Rafael Núñez (politician),  President of Colombia in the 1880s and 1890s
 Samuel B. Nunez, Jr., Louisiana politician
 Yerko Núñez (born 1973), Bolivian politician

Sport

Baseball
 Abraham Núñez (baseball infielder), Major League Baseball infielder for the New York Yankees
 Abraham Núñez (baseball outfielder), Major League Baseball outfielder for the Caffè Danesi Nettuno of Italy's Serie A1
 Dom Núñez, American baseball player
 Clemente Núñez, United States baseball player
 Eduardo Núñez, Major League Baseball infielder for the Boston Red Sox
 Juan Carlos Oviedo, Major League Baseball pitcher, called himself Leo Núñez before 2011

Association football
 Álvaro Adrián Núñez, Uruguayan goalkeeper
 Antonio Núñez, Spanish footballer
 Claudio Núñez, Chilean footballer
 Darwin Núñez, Uruguayan footballer
 Gervasio Núñez, Argentine footballer
 Jorge Martín Núñez, Paraguayan footballer
 Josep Lluís Núñez, former president of FC Barcelona
 Leonel Núñez, Johor Darul Takzim FC player
 Marcelino Núñez, Chilean footballer
 Milton Núñez, Honduran footballer
 Nicolás Núñez, Chilean footballer
 Ramón Núñez, Honduran-American footballer
 Rodrigo Núñez, Chilean footballer
 Sergio Núñez, Uruguayan footballer

Other sport
 José María Núñez Piossek, A rugby union player
 Sidarka Núñez, Dominican Republic volleyball player
Matt Nunez, American floorball player

Science and medicine
 , Chilean physicist
 Manuel Núñez Tovar, Venezuelan naturalist, researcher, parasitologist and entomologist
 Samuel Nunez, United States physician and early Jewish settler in Georgia
 Rafael E. Núñez, cognitive scientist

Other
 Marianela Núñez, Argentine ballet dancer  

Spanish-language surnames
Patronymic surnames
Surnames from given names